John Loughborough Pearson (1817–97) was an English architect whose works were mainly ecclesiastical.  He was born in Brussels, Belgium, and spent his childhood in Durham.  Pearson started his architectural training under Ignatius Bonomi in Durham, becoming his principal assistant.  In 1841 he left Bonomi, worked for George Pickering for a short time, then moved to London, where he lived for the rest of his life.  He worked for five months with Anthony Salvin, then became principal assistant to Philip Hardwick, initially assisting him in the design of buildings at Lincoln's Inn.  Pearson's first individual design was for a small, simple church at Ellerker in the East Riding of Yorkshire.  This led to other commissions in that part of the country, which allowed him to leave Hardwick and establish his own independent practice.

Pearson designed many new churches during his career, ranging from small country churches to major churches in cities.  Among the latter, St Augustine's Church in Kilburn, London, "may claim to be his masterpiece".  Towards the end of his career he designed two new cathedrals, at Truro in Cornwall, and Brisbane in Australia; the latter was not built until after his death, and the building was supervised by his son, Frank.  Pearson also carried out work in existing churches, making additions and alterations, or undertaking restorations.  Again, these works were to churches of all sizes, from country churches to cathedrals; among the latter he worked on the cathedrals at Lincoln, Peterborough, Bristol, Rochester, Leicester, and Gloucester.  Pearson also designed secular buildings, which ranged from schools, vicarages, and small houses, to large country houses, for example, Quarwood in Stow-on-the-Wold, Gloucestershire.  He designed Two Temple Place in Westminster, London, as an estate office for William Waldorf Astor.  Pearson also designed university buildings for Sidney Sussex College and Emmanuel College in Cambridge.

Most of Pearson's buildings are in England (where he worked on at least 210 ecclesiastical buildings), but he also carried out work elsewhere, for example Treberfydd, a country house in Wales, and Holy Trinity Church in Ayr, Scotland.  Further afield, in addition to Brisbane Cathedral, he designed a cemetery chapel in Malta.  His plans were almost always in Gothic Revival style, but in some buildings he used other styles, for example Tudor Revival at Two Temple Place, and Jacobean at Lechlade Manor in Gloucestershire.   In the cemetery chapel in Malta, he combined Romanesque Revival and Gothic Revival features.  Pearson was awarded the Gold Medal of the Royal Institute of British Architects in 1880.  He had one son, Frank Loughborough Pearson, who worked with him as an assistant, completed some of his works after his father's death, and then continued in his own independent practice.  Pearson died at his London home and was buried in Westminster Abbey.  His estate amounted to over £53,000.  This list contains Pearson's major works on existing ecclesiastical works, including all those in the National Heritage List for England.

Key

Works

See also
List of new ecclesiastical buildings by J. L. Pearson
List of non-ecclesiastical works by J. L. Pearson

References
Citations

Sources

 

Pearson, John Loughborough